The 3rd constituency of Oise is a French legislative constituency in the Oise département.

Description

The 3rd constituency of the Oise lies on the southern edge of the department and includes the town of Creil. It is separated from the Paris urban area by the large Oise-Pays-de-France Natural Park.

The seat was in the hands of Socialist Michel Françaix from 1997 to 2017.

Historic Representation

Election results

2022 

 
 
 
 
 
|-
| colspan="8" bgcolor="#E9E9E9"|
|-

2017

2012

 
 
 
 
 
|-
| colspan="8" bgcolor="#E9E9E9"|
|-

Sources
Official results of French elections from 2002: "Résultats électoraux officiels en France" (in French).

3